Euxoa cashmirensis is a species of moth of the family Noctuidae. It is found in Kashmir. The current status of the species needs further study.

References

External links 

Euxoa
Moths of Asia
Moths described in 1903